The 2nd V Chart Awards (第二届音悦V榜年度盛典) is a music awards hosted by YinYueTai on April 15, 2014 at Cadillac Arena, Beijing. The emcee for the award were Li Chen and Bowie Tsang.

Shortlisted Criteria 
1. The "data-based category" award nominees are artists who released an official MV in between January 1, 2014 to December 31, 2014 and the artist must be ranked in the chart throughout the whole year.

2. "The Most Popular Artists" series in the "voting category" of shortlisted nominees are the top 30 artists in the TOP150 list in all five regions.

3. "Jury category" nominees are shortlisted artists based on the year-long results of the China Billboard V Chart and the nominees will go through a panel of senior musicians.

Website 
On the main section of the official website for The 2nd V Chart Awards, the official website of the award ceremony added the review section of the festival (which is the first time YinYueTai is doing so), news commentary and the video canvassing area for fans. Users can not only express their opinions, but also interact through games and interactions. Exchanges and interaction among various fandoms and other forums are set to understand the festival's dynamics and voting process, and the official website facilitates various fandoms to canvassing support to their singer.

Personnel

Host 
YinYueTai

Data provider 
YinYueTai Mobile App, YinYueTai PC App, YinYueTai Official Website, Baidu

Interworking Partners 
Billboard, Gaon Charts

Voting 
On March 1, 2014, The 2nd V Chart Awards was officially launched. Promotional posters were released online on March 11. On March 17, the first phase of the "Favourite Artist of the Year" series of polls began and ended on the 26th. The second phase of the "Favourite Artist of the Year" series of polls commenced from March 30 till April 8. A complete list of the attendees was announced on April 5.

Winners and nominees

References 

2014 music awards
2014 in Chinese music
Events in Beijing
V Chart Awards
April 2014 events in China